Cassandra Yates (born March 2, 1951) is an American actress known for her performances on television.

Early years 
Yates was born and raised in Macon, Georgia. Her mother named her after the character Cassandra portrayed by Betty Field in Kings Row. When Yates was young, her family moved from Atlanta to Dublin, Georgia.

After studying art, Yates was a commercial illustrator before she began cutting hair and eventually opened her own beauty shop. Her first contact with acting came through night classes and performances in plays at little theaters.

Career 
Her most high-profile role was probably in Dynasty as Sarah Curtis. Yates also appeared in the 1981 TV version of John Steinbeck's Of Mice and Men. She appeared in various television series, including McMillan & Wife, Rich Man, Poor Man Book II, The Bionic Woman, The Streets of San Francisco, Barnaby Jones, Quincy, M.E., Vega$, Simon & Simon, Magnum, P.I., Hotel, Cagney & Lacey, Thirtysomething and Murder, She Wrote in the 1984 episode "Deadly Lady".

In 1978, she starred as Laura Coe, a disc jockey, in the movie FM. She also played roles in two films directed by Sam Peckinpah: Convoy (1978), and The Osterman Weekend (1983). Her other film credits include Rolling Thunder (1977), F.I.S.T. (1978), The Evil (1978), St. Helens (1981) and Unfaithfully Yours (1984).

Filmography

References

External links
 

1951 births
Living people
American television actresses
Actors from Macon, Georgia
20th-century American actresses
21st-century American actresses
American film actresses